Rutherford George Montgomery (April 12, 1894 – July 3, 1985) was an American writer of children's books. In addition to his given name, he used the pseudonyms A.A. Avery, Al Avery, Art Elder, E.P. Marshall, and Everitt Proctor.

Life

Montgomery was born in Straubville, Sargent County, North Dakota, "a true ghost town" as of 2005. to George Y. and Matilda Proctor Montgomery. He studied at Colorado Agricultural College, Western State College of Colorado, and University of Nebraska; taught elementary school in Hot Springs, Wyoming; and from 1917 to 1919 served in the United States Air Corps. During the 1920s, he worked as a teacher and principal at junior and senior high schools in Montrose County, Colorado.

Montgomery married Eunice Opal Kirks in 1930; they had three children. He served Gunnison County, Colorado, as a judge from 1931 to 1936 and as county commissioner from 1932 to 1938, then became a freelance writer.

While still at school, Montgomery began writing stories about the wild animals that lived around his family's farm. He went on to write books about aviation and the people, landscapes and animals of the American West, particularly horses. In all, he wrote more than 100 books.

From 1941 to 1946, Montgomery was a writer for Dick Tracy. He worked as a creative writing teacher 1955–57 and as a scriptwriter for Walt Disney Studios 1958–1962.

Literary awards

Kildee House: Newbery Award Honor Book, 1950. 
Wapiti the Elk: Commonwealth Club of California Juvenile Silver Medal, 1952 
Beaver Water: New York Herald Tribune Children's Spring Book Festival Award, 1956; Boy's Clubs of America Junior Book Award, 1957
The Stubborn One:	Western Writers of America Golden Spur Award, 1965

Works

As by Everitt Proctor

 The last cruise of the Jeannette (1944)
 Men against the ice (1946)

As by Rutherford Montgomery

 Warhawk Patrol" (1944)

As by Al Avery, A Yankee Flier 
Pulse-quickening stories of the fearless young airman, Stan Wilson. According to the Library of Congress catalog, all nine books were 204 to 216-page, published by Grosset & Dunlap from 1941 to 1946. The first six were illustrated by Paul Laune, the last three by Clayton Knight.A Yankee Flier with the R.A.F. (1941)A Yankee Flier in the Far East (1942)A Yankee Flier in the South Pacific (1943)A Yankee Flier in North Africa (1943)A Yankee Flier in Italy (1944)A Yankee Flier Over Berlin (1944)A Yankee Flier in Normandy (1945)A Yankee Flier on a Rescue Mission (1945)A Yankee Flier Under Secret Orders (1946)The Golden StallionThe Golden Stallion (1951); also published as The Capture of the Golden StallionThe Golden Stallion (abridged)The Golden Stallion's Revenge (1953)The Golden Stallion to the Rescue (1954)The Golden Stallion's Victory (1956)The Golden Stallion and the Wolf Dog (1958)The Golden Stallion's Adventure at Redstone (1959)The Golden Stallion and the Mysterious Feud (1967)

OtherA Kinkajou on the TownAmikukBeaver WaterBig BrownieBig Red: A Wild Stallion (1971)Black Powder EmpireBroken FangCarcajouClaim jumpers of Marble CanyonCorey's Sea MonsterCrazy Kill Range (1963)El Blanco: The Legend of the White Stallion (1961)Ghost Town AdventureGray WolfHigh CountryHill RanchHuskyIceblink (1941), as by George R. MontgomeryIn Happy HollowJet Navigator, Strategic Air CommandKent Barstow Aboard the Dyna SoarKent Barstow and the Commando FlightKent Barstow on a B-70 MissionKent Barstow: Space Man Kildee HouseKing of the Castle: The Story of a Kangaroo RatMcGonnigle's lakeMcNulty's HolidayMidnight: Wild Stallion of the West (1940)Mister Jim (1953)Pekan the ShadowRufusSnowman (1962)The Capture of West Wind (1962)The Living WildernessThe Silver HillsThe Stubborn One (1965)Timberline TalesTroopers ThreeWalt Disney's Cougar: A Fact-Fiction Nature StoryWalt Disney's The Odyssey of an OtterWapiti the ElkWar WingsWeecha The RacoonWhitetail: The Story of a Prairie DogYellow EyesSee also
 

References

Natlee Kenoyer, "Rutherford Montgomery: A Remembrance", The Roundup'', Nov–Dec 1985, p. 28

External links
 
 
 
 Straubville, North Dakota: A true ghost town at Ghosts of North Dakota
 Rutherford George Montgomery at Library of Congress Authorities — with 103 catalog records

 

American children's writers
Disney people
Newbery Honor winners
People from North Dakota
1894 births
1985 deaths
Place of death missing